Hunter is an English and Scottish surname. Notable people with the surname include:

A
 Adam Hunter (disambiguation), multiple people
 Adelaide Hoodless (née Addie Hunter, 1857-1910), Canadian activist
 Adriana Hunter, British translator
 Aislinn Hunter, Canadian writer and poet
 Al Hunter (disambiguation), multiple people
 Alan Hunter (disambiguation), multiple people
 Albert Hunter (1900–1969), British politician
 Alberta Hunter (1895–1984), American singer
 Alexander Hunter (disambiguation), multiple people
 Alexis Hunter (born 1948), New Zealand painter and photographer
 Allan Hunter (disambiguation), multiple people
 Ally Hunter (born 1949), Scottish footballer
 Alyson Hunter (born 1948), New Zealand photographer
 Amy Hunter (born 1966), American actress and model
 Andrew Hunter (disambiguation), multiple people named Andrew or Andy
 Andria Hunter (born 1967), Canadian women's ice hockey player
 Anji Hunter (born 1955), British political consultant
 Anne Hunter (1742–1821), Scottish poet and socialite
 Anthony R. Hunter (born 1943), British-American biologist
 April Hunter (born 1974), American professional wrestler
 Art Hunter (born 1933), American football player

B
 Barry Hunter (disambiguation), multiple people
 Bertrum Hunter (1906–1948), American baseball player
 Bill Hunter (disambiguation), multiple people
 Billy Hunter (disambiguation), multiple people
 Brian Hunter (outfielder) (born 1971), American baseball player
 Bruce Hunter (disambiguation), multiple people
 Buddy Hunter (born 1947), American baseball player

C
 Catfish Hunter (1946–1999), American baseball player
 Chris Hunter (disambiguation), multiple people
 Christine Hunter, American clinical psychologist and military officer

D
 Danielle Hunter (born 1994), Jamaican-born American football player
 David Hunter (1803–1888), American general
 De'Andre Hunter (born 1997), American basketball player
 Duncan Hunter (born 1948), American politician
Drew Hunter (born 1997), American middle-distance runner from Purcellville, Virginia

E
 Eddie Hunter (disambiguation), multiple people
 Emma Hunter (1831–1904), American telegrapher
 Evan Hunter (1926–2005), American author and screenwriter

F
 Felando Hunter (born 1990), perpetrator of the 2012 torture-murders of Jourdan Bobbish and Jacob Kudla in Detroit
 Francis Hunter (1894–1981), American tennis player
 Frank Hunter (disambiguation), multiple people
 Frederick Creighton "Newt" Hunter (1880  1963), first baseman in Major League Baseball

G
 Geoff Hunter (disambiguation), multiple people
 Gordon Hunter (disambiguation), multiple people

H
 Hal Hunter (disambiguation), multiple people
 Heather Hunter (born 1969), American hip hop artist
 Henry Hunter (RAF officer) (1893–1966)
 Herb Hunter (1895–1970), American baseball player
 Hezekiah Hunter (1837–1894), American teacher, minister, and politician
 Holly Hunter (born 1958), American actress
 Howard W. Hunter (1907–1995), American church leader
 Humphrey Hunter, Scottish footballer

I
 Ian Hunter (disambiguation), multiple people

J
 J. A. Hunter (1887–1963), Scottish hunter and writer
 James Hunter (disambiguation), multiple people
 Janie Hunter (1918–1997), American singer and storyteller
 Jeffrey Hunter (1926–1969), American actor
 J. Marvin Hunter (1880–1957), American publisher and writer
 John Hunter (Royal Navy officer) (1737–1821), British admiral and colonial governor
 John Hunter (American football) (born 1965), NFL player
 John Hunter (surgeon) (1728–1793), Scottish surgeon
 Johnny Hunter (1925-1980), Australian rugby league footballer
 Joseph Hunter (1783–1861), Sheffield antiquarian

K
 Kelly Hunter (born 1963), British actress
 Kenneth Hunter (disambiguation), multiple people
 Kenny Hunter (born 1962), Scottish sculptor
 Kim Hunter (1922–2002), American actress

L
 Lissa Hunter, American artist
 Long John Hunter (1931–2016), American blues guitarist, singer and songwriter
 Louis C. Hunter (1898–1984), American economic historian
 Lurlean Hunter, American singer

M
 Marc Hunter (1953–1998), New Zealand singer
 Mark Hunter (disambiguation), multiple people
 Martin Hunter (disambiguation), multiple people
 Matt Hunter (disambiguation), multiple people
 Matthew A. Hunter (1878–1961), metallurgist
 Michael Hunter (disambiguation), multiple people

N
 Norman Hunter (footballer) (1943–2020), English football player
Neilia Hunter Biden (1942-1972), First wife of Joe Biden

O
 Othello Hunter (born 1986), American-Liberian basketball player in the Israeli Basketball Premier League

P
 Paul Hunter (disambiguation), multiple people

R
 R. J. Hunter (born 1993), American basketball player
 Rachel Hunter (born 1969), New Zealand model
 Raymond Hunter (1938–2020), Irish cricketer and rugby union player
 Reginald D. Hunter (born 1969), American comedian
 Rielle Hunter (born 1964), American film producer
 Robert Hunter (disambiguation), multiple people
 Robin Hunter (1929–2004), British actor
 Ron Hunter (born 1964), American basketball coach (father of R. J.)
 Ronald Hunter (c. 1943–2013), American actor
 Ruby Hunter (1955–2010), Australian singer-songwriter

S
 Siobhan Hunter (born 1994), Scottish footballer
 Stephen Hunter (born 1946), American author
 Steve Hunter (born 1948), American guitarist

T
 Tab Hunter (1931-2018), American actor
 Teola Pearl Hunter (born 1933), American politician
 Thomas Hunter (disambiguation), multiple people
 Tim Hunter (disambiguation), multiple people
 Todd Ames Hunter (born 1953), American politician
 Tommy Hunter (born 1986), American Major League baseball pitcher
 Torii Hunter (born 1975), American baseball player
 Trent Hunter (born 1980), Canadian ice hockey player

W
 William Hunter (disambiguation), multiple people
 Waldemar Caerel Hunter (1919–1968), Indonesian actor

Z
 Zach Hunter (born 1991), American activist

Fictional characters
 Hillman Hunter (The Hitchhiker's Guide to the Galaxy), a character in And Another Thing...
 Howard Hunter, a character in the television series Hill Street Blues
 Jamie Hunter, a character in the television series River City
 Leslie Hunter, a character in the film St. Elmo's Fire
 Lisa Hunter, a character in the television series Hollyoaks
 Matt Hunter (General Hospital), character in American TV series General Hospital
 Rip Hunter, a character in DC Comics
 Shawn Hunter, a character in the television series Boy Meets World
 Timothy Hunter, a character in DC Comics
 Roxy Hunter, a character in the film series Roxy Hunter
 Lance Hunter, a Marvel Comics character

See also
 Hunter (given name)

English-language surnames
Occupational surnames
English-language occupational surnames